Paidipally is a village in the Hanamkonda district of Telangana state in India. It is located in outskirts of Warangal City. Paidipally is located in the semi-arid region of Telangana. Paidipally is the part of the Greater Warangal Municipal Corporation as 1st division

Villages in Hanamkonda district